Deer Park Monastery (Vietnamese: Tu Viện Lộc Uyển) is a  Buddhist monastery in Escondido, California. It was founded in July 2000 by Thích Nhất Hạnh along with monastic and lay practitioners from the Plum Village Tradition. The monastery is under the direct guidance of Thích Nhất Hạnh and his Order of Interbeing in the Vietnamese Thiền tradition.

Details
Deer Park follows the same practices and schedule as Plum Village Monastery and its sister monastery Blue Cliff Monastery in New York and Magnolia Grove Monastery in Mississippi.

Since its founding in July 2000 the monastery has grown to be very active. In addition to its regular monastic schedule, Deer Park hosts weekly days of mindfulness which are open to the public as well as a variety of themed and general retreats. Over the years the ordained Sangha has been growing and currently consists of 14 monks and 23 nuns.  Lay practitioners also live at the monastery.

The monastery is now composed of two hamlets; Solidity Hamlet for monks and laymen and Clarity Hamlet for nuns and laywomen.

All retreats at Deer Park Monastery include the basic practices of sitting meditation and chanting, walking meditation, mindful eating, group discussions, touching the Earth, total relaxation, and working meditation. Depending on the retreat, extra activities may include private consultations, mountain hiking, bonfire, and song & skit performances. Retreats are for beginners and experienced practitioners of meditation and mindfulness.

Gallery

See also
Buddhism in the United States
Buddhist Monasticism
Timeline of Zen Buddhism in the United States

References

External links

Deer Park Monastery
Plum Village

Vietnamese-American culture in California
Plum Village Tradition
Buddhist monasteries in the United States
Overseas Vietnamese Buddhist temples
Religious buildings and structures in San Diego County, California
Buddhism in California
Religious organizations established in 2000
Overseas Vietnamese organizations in the United States
Escondido, California
2000 establishments in California
21st-century Buddhist temples